Thyrostroma is a genus of fungi in the family Botryosphaeriaceae. There are 19 species.

Species
Thyrostroma acanthophylli
Thyrostroma astragali
Thyrostroma compactum
Thyrostroma ephedrae
Thyrostroma eucalypti
Thyrostroma halimodendri
Thyrostroma jatrophae
Thyrostroma kosaroffii
Thyrostroma macrosporum
Thyrostroma mori
Thyrostroma negundinis
Thyrostroma obtectum
Thyrostroma piskorzii
Thyrostroma ramoconidiiferum
Thyrostroma salicis
Thyrostroma sirokoffii
Thyrostroma speciosum
Thyrostroma utahense
Thyrostroma vleugelianum

External links
 Index Fungorum

Botryosphaeriaceae
Taxa named by Franz Xaver Rudolf von Höhnel
Taxa described in 1911